Alessandro Tremignón (or Tremignàn, Tremiglióne; 1635–1711) was an Italian architect from Padua.

Work
Tremignon was active in Venice.
He was influenced by Baldassare Longhèna. 
Tremignon adapted the High Baroque structural style of Longhena into a typically Late Baroque style with pictorial effects exemplified by the facade of the San Moisè church.

His most famous work is the  facade of the San Moisè with its exuberant sculptural decorations.
The name of the church of San Moisè (Saint Moses) treats the old-Testament figure of Moses as a saint in the Byzantine manner.
It also honors Moisè Venier, who paid for restoration of the church in the tenth century.
The facade was designed by Tremignon and mostly sculpted by Heinrich Meyring (Arrigo Meréngo), one of Gian Lorenzo Bernini's pupils.
It features grotesque carvings of camels above the main entrance.
The main altarpiece, also the work of Tremignon and Meyring, represents Mount Sinai with Moses Receiving the Tablets.
John Ruskin wrote of San Moisè, "It is notable as one of the basest examples of the basest school of the Renaissance."

The Palazzo Flangini Fini is attributed to Tremignon, and was built around 1688.
Tremignon built the entrance to the Venetian Arsenal  to the east of St. Mark's Square between 1692 and 1694.
Around 1700 Tremignon and Andrea Cominelli were the architects of the Palazzo Labia.
Tremignon also designed the high altar of the Cathedral of Santa Maria Assunta (Chioggia), with engraved scenes of the life of the Virgin Mary and the two patron saints.

References

Sources

 

1635 births
1711 deaths
Architects from Padua
17th-century Italian architects